The Constitution (1916) of Mendoza Province, Argentina, states that the executive power of the province will be led by a citizen chosen as a governor by the people for a four-year term, and not allowed to be re-elected for the immediately following term.

Before it was constituted as a province in 1920, Mendoza Province was known as the Province of Cuyo. Before 1813, it was part of Córdoba Province. The office of governor came into existence when the independent province was created.

Since that time Mendoza Province has had almost a hundred governors, as well as other types of officials in charge of the executive power.

The office of the Governor of Mendoza is on the 4th floor of the Government House building, inside the Civic Center of the City of Mendoza. The Civic Center is a park with administrative buildings of the executive and judicial powers and the Mendoza Province Federal Court.

The office of the governor is commonly known as The Seat of San Martín, since José de San Martín was one of the first governors of the province. This was the only executive office that San Martín ever held in the history of Argentina.

List of governors

Before the Sáenz Peña Law (1820-1914)

After the Sáenz Peña Law (1914-Present)

See also
 Legislature of Mendoza
 Senate of Mendoza
 Chamber of Deputies of Mendoza

References

External links
 Government of Mendoza (in Spanish)